is a Japanese fishing-themed manga series written by Jūzō Yamasaki and illustrated by Kenichi Kitami. It has been serialized in Shogakukan's seinen manga magazine Big Comic Original since 1979. It won the 28th Shogakukan Manga Award in 1983. The series has been adapted into a popular and long running movie series and anime television series. By 2020, it had over 26 million copies in circulation.

Overview
The story focuses on salaryman Densuke Hamasaki (a.k.a. Hama-chan), whom his supervisor Sasaki has dubbed the "Fishing Baka" because of his passion for fishing. One day Hama-chan meets and befriends an older fisherman named Su-san, who turns out to be Ichinosuke Suzuki, the CEO of the "Suzuki Construction" company that Hama-chan works for. The stories tend to focus on their relationship inside and outside of the office.

Characters

Nicknamed . A salaryman/fishing baka who escapes his boring work life through fishing.

Hama-chan's wife.

Hama-chan's son.

The Hamasaki family dog.

Nicknamed . Hama-chan's boss who becomes his fishing apprentice.

Hama-chan's supervisor who doesn't understand his love for fishing and sometimes mispronounces his name as Hamazaki.

Manga
The individual chapters have been collected into volumes from July 29, 1980, to volume 109 on March 30, 2022

Film series
The franchise had a live-action film series that spanned 20 mainline films released from 1988 to 2009, along with two spin-off films. The following are lists of the films and the regular cast members.

Series

Regular cast
Densuke Hamasaki: Toshiyuki Nishida (1~)
Ichinosuke Suzuki: Rentarō Mikuni (1~)
Michiko Hamasaki: Eri Ishida (1~Special), Miyoko Asada (7~)
Koitarou Hamasaki: Tomo Ueno (10~11), Ryūichi Sugawara (12~13), Kaga Mochimaru (14~)
Kazuo Sasaki: Kei Tani (1~)
Hachirou Ohta: Ken Nakamoto (1~)
Hisae Suzuki: Yatsuko Tanami (1~6), Tomoko Naraoka (9~)
Director Akiyama: Takehiko Maeda (1), Takeshi Katō (3~)
Executive Director Hotta: Takehiko Maeda (3~8), Shinobu Tsuruta (9~10, 12~), Shūichirō Moriyama (11)
Chief of Personnel Haraguchi: Raita Ryū (7~10), Toshio Shiba (11~13), Takehiko Ono (14~)
Secretary Kusamori: Yasuhisa Sonoda (2~6), Takuzō Kadono (7~9), Baijaku Nakamura (10~13, 15~), Yōsuke Saitō (14)
Section Chief Funaki: Tōru Masuoka (15~)
Chief Clerk Takoshima: Mitsuru Katō (11~12, 16~), Hiroshi Iwazaki (13)
Maebara: Takashi Sasano (1~)

Anime television series

Cast
Densuke Hamasaki: Kōichi Yamadera
Ichinosuke Suzuki: Chikao Ōtsuka
Michiko Hamasaki: Misa Watanabe
Koitarou Hamasaki: Akemi Satō
Hazatarou: Naomi Shindō (2nd voice)
Kazuo Sasaki: Naoki Tatsuta
Sasaki's Wife: Chie Satō
Madoko Suzuki: Emiko Tanada
Kenichirou Dago: Tomokazu Seki
Reiko Nakamura: Makiko Ōmoto
Yuusuke Sou: Katsuyuki Konishi
Narration, Chief Akiyama, Hazetarou (1st voice): Yasuhiko Kawazu

TV series
 Gaku Hamada : Densuke Hamasaki
 Toshiyuki Nishida : Ichinosuke Suzuki

References

External links
 Tsuribaka Nisshi film official website 
 Tsuribaka Nisshi anime official website 
 

 
1979 manga
2002 anime television series debuts
Fishing in anime and manga
Seinen manga
Shogakukan manga
Toei Animation television
TV Asahi original programming
Winners of the Shogakukan Manga Award for general manga